Guatimotzin is an opera in one act and nine scenes composed by Aniceto Ortega del Villar to a libretto in Spanish by José Tomás de Cuéllar. It premiered on 13 September 1871 at the Gran Teatro Nacional in Mexico City. Described as an episodio musical (musical episode), its plot is based on the defense of Mexico by its last Aztec emperor, Cuauhtémoc (also known as Guatimotzin). It was one of the earliest Mexican operas to use a native subject.

Background and performance history
A romanticised account of the heroic but doomed defense of Mexico by its last Aztec emperor, Cuauhtémoc, Guatimotzin was one of the earliest Mexican operas to use a native subject and to incorporate indigenous music into its score.

Aniceto Ortega, who was also a prominent physician and surgeon, worked on the composition in his free time between patients and late at night. His references to native music can be seen especially in the dances "Tlaxcalteca" (which quotes a Mexican folk tune, "El perico") and "Tzotzopizahuac".  According to Robert Stevenson, the latter resembles the third movement of Beethoven's Seventh Symphony rather more than it does indigenous music, but the score would later cause Ortega "to be hailed as a Mexican Glinka".

The libretto in Spanish verse was written by José Tomás de Cuéllar, a well-known poet, playwright, and novelist and the editor of several Mexican periodicals, including La Linterna Magica and La Illustracion Potosina. His fictional works often had a spiritual element and dealt with themes from native Mexican culture. When de Cuéllar became ill at one point, Ortega also worked on parts of the libretto.

Guatimotzin premiered on 13 September 1871 at the Gran Teatro Nacional in Mexico City. It was performed as a benefit for the conductor, Enrico Moderati, by members of Ángela Peralta's opera company with Enrico Tamberlik in the title role.  The sets and costumes were designed by Riccardo Fontana, based on drawings in the Mendoza Codex and advice from prominent historians. According to the art historian, Christopher Fulton, the opera's premiere was its sole performance. However, its staging may have influenced the depiction of Cuauhtémoc's torture and death in the bronze relief by Gabriel Guerra on the Cuauhtémoc Monument in Mexico City.

Principal roles

Princess Malintzin (soprano) created by Ángela Peralta
Cuauhtémoc (tenor) created by Enrico Tamberlik
Hernán Cortés (bass) created by Louis Gassier.

Notes and references

Sources
Bonaparte, Roland, Le Mexique au début du 20e siècle, C. Delagrave, 1904
Cambas, Manuel Rivera, México Pintoresco, Vol. 1, La Reforma, 1880
de Olavarría y Ferrari, Enrique, Reseña histórica del teatro en México, Volume 3, La Europea, 1895
Fulton, Christopher, "Cuauhtémoc regained", Estudios de Historia Moderna y Contemporánea de México, No. 36, January–June 2008, pp. 5–47
García Mora, Carlos and Krotz, Esteban, La Antropología en México: Panorama histórico, Volume 9, Instituto Nacional de Antropología e Historia, 1988. 
Grout, Donald Jay and Williams, Hermine Weigel, A short history of opera, Columbia University Press, 2003. 
International Musicological Society, Report of the International Musicological Society Congress, Vol. 1, Bärenreiter, 1993
Price, Curtis Alexander et al., Italian Opera in Late Eighteenth-century London: The King's Theatre, Haymarket, 1778-1791, Oxford University Press, 1995. 

Velázquez, Guillermo Orta, Breve historia de la música en México, Librería de M. Porrúa, 1971
Werner, Michael S., Concise encyclopedia of Mexico, Taylor & Francis, 2001. 

Operas
Spanish-language operas
1871 operas
One-act operas
Operas set in Mexico
Aztecs in fiction